A security log is used to track security-related information on a computer system. Examples include:
 Windows Security Log
 Internet Connection Firewall security log
According to Stefan Axelsson, "Most UNIX installations do not run any form of security logging software, mainly because the security logging facilities are expensive in terms of disk storage, processing time, and the cost associated with analyzing the audit trail, either manually or by special software."

See also
Audit trail
Server log
Log management and intelligence
Web log analysis software
Web counter
Data logging
Common Log Format
Syslog

References

Computer security